The Messenger is an action-platform video game developed by Sabotage Studio and published by Devolver Digital for Microsoft Windows, Nintendo Switch, PlayStation 4, and Xbox One. The story follows a Ninja from a village that foretells a "Western Hero" who will save them from the Demon King. Upon the fulfillment of the prophecy, the Western Hero appoints the Ninja as the Messenger, and is tasked to take a scroll to the mountain. The game incorporates elements such as time travel, with the visuals changing from 8-bit to 16-bit to represent the Messenger traveling to the future. 

Development began as a personal project between Thierry Boulanger and Phillippe Dionne with inspiration coming from Ninja Gaiden and other 8-bit and 16-bit games that Boulanger played as a child. After a year in development, more people joined the project to establish Sabotage Studio. The game was well-received among critics. With praise for both gameplay, music, and graphical style shifts.

Gameplay 
The Messenger is a side-scrolling action-platformer, inspired by the classic Ninja Gaiden series. Players control a ninja known as "The Messenger" as he goes on a quest to deliver a scroll. The Messenger initially possesses a technique called "Cloudstepping", which allows him to perform an extra jump in mid-air after attacking an enemy, object, or projectile. As the game progresses, the Messenger gains new abilities such as climbing walls, gliding in the air, long-range shuriken attacks, and using a grappling hook to propel himself through obstacles and enemies. By collecting Time Shards earned by defeating enemies or hitting lamps, the player can purchase additional upgrades such as health bonuses or extra attack moves. If the player dies, however, a demon named Quarble will appear and automatically claim any Time Shards the player collects as payment for a short amount of time.

The game initially presents itself as a linear level-based adventure split across two eras; the past, which is presented with 8-bit graphics and audio, and the future, which uses 16-bit presentation. Later on, however, the game becomes a Metroidvania-style game, in which the player revisits past eras in any order and direction in order to find key items. In this section of the game, the player can use special warps to instantly move between the past and present, instantly changing the layout of each level and allowing them to access new areas. Hidden in some areas are green medallions, earned by completing a challenging platforming section, with a bonus unlocked for collecting all 45.

Plot 
The story follows an unnamed ninja from a village of ninjas that foretells a prophecy of a "Western Hero" saving them from the Demon King. One day, the village of ninjas is attacked by the Demon King. The "Western Hero" arrives and gives a scroll to the ninja, appointing him as "The Messenger" and telling him to travel east and deliver it to the top of a mountain. During his journey, the Messenger is aided by a mysterious blue-robed shopkeeper, who provides him with upgrades, and a demon named Quarble, who helps to save him from death by rewinding time. After traveling through various areas and meeting and befriending foes, the Messenger arrives at the top of the mountain and encounters the Tower of Time along with more blue-robed figures, who send him 500 years into the future to defeat the Demon King's general, Barma'thazël. After defeating him, the Messenger loops around the world to the ninja village, where he deduces that he is the new Western Hero himself, passes the scroll onto a new Messenger, and takes up the role of a shopkeeper providing him with upgrades.

When this new hero ends up dying due to the previous shopkeeper's negligence, however, the blue-robe figures aim to break the cursed cycle, tasking the Messenger with collecting the notes of a mysterious music box in the Tower of Time. After the Messenger succeeds in this task, defeating the Demon King in the process, the shopkeeper explains the nature of the music box and the origin of the Messenger: it is the prison of a man known as the Phantom who had been cursed by the Demon King, allowing the demons to invade the human realm every 500 years. In an effort to stop the curse, Phantom created the scroll and attuned it with time magic, creating a continual cycle of Messengers that would pass down the scroll before becoming part of the Order of the Blue Robes to assist in the next generation. Venturing inside the music box, the Messenger finds the Phantom, defeats the curse possessing him, and rescues him; the curse breaks loose but the Messenger and the blue-robes team up together to destroy it, putting an end to the curse.

Picnic Panic DLC
In an alternate timeline, the Demon General Barma'thazël lures the Messenger into a trap. Using voodoo magic, Barma'thazël creates an evil doppelgänger known as the Dark Messenger before fusing with it but is defeated by the Messenger and the blue-robes. However, Barma'thazël reveals the Dark Messenger's defeat was necessary, absorbing its essence into a magic seed and escaping. As the heroes celebrate their victory, Barma'thazël has the magic seed planted.

Development
The Messenger was developed by indie development studio Sabotage Studio. The game began as a personal project between Thierry Boulanger serving as creative director and Phillipe Dionne as the level designer being worked on between evenings and weekends for a year. Wanting to work on the game full-time, Boulanger reached out to Martin Brouard for assistance in finances and marketing, which he decided to co-found Sabotage Studio with Boulanger in 2016 and continued to develop the game for two more years. Boulanger was inspired by Ninja Gaiden to make a game with a Ninja as a playable character ever since he was a child, believing they are the perfect player character due to their selfless and ambiguous personality allowing players to project onto them. The Messenger released on Microsoft Windows and Nintendo Switch on August 30, 2018, PlayStation 4 on March 19, 2019, and Xbox One on June 25, 2020. 

The music was composed by chiptune-composer Eric W. Brown, better known by his alias, Rainbowdragoneyes.  Each track was made in both 8-bit NES and 16-bit Sega Genesis styles using Famitracker and DefleMask respectively. The soundtrack release also featured bonus tracks by Keiji Yamagishi.

Reception

The game won several awards prior to its release. It won the Start-Up Numix in 2016. It also won Best Music and Best Gameplay during the Montreal Indie Game Festival of 2017. At The Game Awards 2018, it was nominated for "Best Independent Game" and "Best Debut Indie Game", winning the latter. It was also nominated for "Best Debut" with Sabotage at the Game Developers Choice Awards, and for the G.A.N.G. / MAGFEST People's Choice Award at the 2019 G.A.N.G. Awards. The PlayStation 4 version won the award for "Control Design, 2D or Limited 3D" at the 2020 NAVGTR Awards, whereas its other nominations were for "Control Precision" and "Original Light Mix Score, New IP".

The Messenger received "generally favorable reviews" according to Metacritic. GameSpot liked the dialogue, liking the self-aware tone it took, saying, "The excellent writing keeps things lively and fresh... regularly riffing on action-platformer tropes through the ninja warrior's conversations with various characters". Kotaku called it a great metroidvania game. Destructoid praised the controls, feeling they were "tight and responsive, even in handheld mode on the Switch’s tiny Joy-Con. I was able to make my ninja leap from platform to platform with ease". Kat Bailey of USgamer enjoyed the 8-bit art and chiptune score, calling it "an outstanding achievement in artistic design".

While feeling he could be a nuisance, Nintendo Life thought Quarble was an interesting way of replacing the lives system, describing it as "a nuisance to be sure, but a charming way of punishing players for their mistakes." Nintendo World Report wrote that the constantly evolving move-set kept the player engaged in the combat, saying it was "a continual impressive trajectory that is an absolute blast to experience". IGN felt the transition to 16-bit worlds hurt the game's pacing, describing the additions as "padding the back half with repetitive backtracking and boring fetch quests".

VentureBeat praised the art, singling out the backgrounds as "gorgeous" and noting how The Messenger had a "distinct feel that goes beyond typical video game cliches". Game Informer's Brian Shea enjoyed the bosses of the game, writing that, "each boss challenges you in unique ways, ranging from massive monsters with lasers and projectiles to smaller adversaries that jump around the screen and attack you up close". Polygon liked the end of the game, but felt it took too long for the game to reach its stride, "The Messenger gets better with each hour, but that means that to reach its best moments, you have to muscle through some pretty familiar and blunt old-school game design".

Prequel
A prequel titled Sea of Stars, was announced in March 2020. Sabotage Studio crowdfunded the game via Kickstarter, and it was set to be released in 2022 for PC and consoles. Unlike The Messenger, Sea of Stars is a turn-based role-playing video game.

References

External links

Indie video games
Action video games
Platform games
Windows games
Nintendo Switch games
PlayStation 4 games
Retro-style video games
Video games developed in Canada
2018 video games
Video games about demons
Video games about ninja
Metroidvania games
Japan in non-Japanese culture
Xbox Cloud Gaming games
The Game Awards winners